The Chapel of the Resurrection or Chapel for Europe is a Roman Catholic church with an ecumenical vocation located in the heart of the Brussels' European Quarter (City of Brussels municipality), next to the former Convent Van Maerlant. A precursor of this church, which dated back to the 15th century, was situated in the city centre, but demolished in the course of urban development in 1907. Instead, a replica, externally true to the original, was built at its present location. In 2001, after substantial renovation, the church received its present name and took on its present ecumenical character.

History 

Because of urban development measures, the chapel had to give way for the construction of Brussels Central Station. The original chapel and adjoining convent was scheduled for demolition and a duplicate was built on the / by the expropriated Order Sisters of Perpetual Adoration. This new chapel was inaugurated on 14 October 1908.

In 1974, the sisters decided to sell the convent—which comprised what is now the entire block—while the main building today accommodates a library and a visitors' centre of the European Commission. The chapel was sold to an international non-profit association constituted under Belgian law, which had been founded by members of the EU institutions in order to maintain the chapel as a space for prayer and liturgy. Through donations and contributions of the Catholic Episcopal Conferences of Europe (COMECE), the Conference of European Churches (CEC), the Society of Jesus, the King Baudouin Foundation and numerous other institutions, the chapel was completely renovated and restructured in 1999–2000. On 25 September 2001, Archbishop Godfried Cardinal Daneels officially inaugurated the new church.

Architecture

Interior
While the chapel's neo-Renaissance facade and its exterior remained unchanged, the interior was completely restructured and designed by Marionex Architects, Brussels. Today's building has four storeys: The visitor enters the chapel through a foyer (ground floor), which is used as a meeting and exhibition space. The basement contains a crypt, reserved for silent prayer and worship. The gold-plated cross is a work of the Belgian sculptor Philippe Denis. The liturgical main room is now located on the first floor and is accessible by an interior staircase and a lift.

Windows and organ

Since the church has lost its full original height, new windows by the Viennese artist Thomas Reinhold were inserted. The side windows show the themes of Creation, Incarnation, the Burning Bush and Pentecost, whereas the window of the main facade represents the Resurrection. They windows produced by the factory of the Schlierbach convent in Upper Austria and financed by nine Austrian regions. On a side gallery, the chapel has an organ from the workshop Etienne Debaisieux, the instrument being a gift by the Evangelical Church in Germany (EKD). In the floor above, the building accommodates a meeting hall and office rooms (not visible from outside).

Pastoral approach and current functions
The Chapel of the Resurrection is not a parish church. Due to its particular location in a business district and in close proximity to the EU institutions (Council of the European Union, European Parliament, European Commission, etc.), it serves as a place of discussion, meeting and prayer linked to these work-places. Therefore, the chapel is opened mostly on weekdays. It offers a wide range of liturgical events, taking in consideration the diversity of confessions, languages and nationalities of this mainly within a mostly "European" public. On the first and third Sundays of each month a Finnish Lutheran communion service is held in the morning as part of the Finnish Seamen's Mission. A Catholic multilingual youth mass takes place every first and third Sunday of each month in the evening. Because of its proximity to the European Union's offices, the chapel is well used by EU civil servants and is used for weddings, baptisms, and memorial services. The chapel is conducted by a pastoral team of religious and lay volunteers. In addition to regular morning prayers (on weekdays), Catholic, Lutheran and Eastern Orthodox services are offered, usually at lunch time, in several languages, but mainly in English and French.

See also
 List of Jesuit sites in Belgium
 List of Catholic churches in Belgium

References

Bibliography
Tenth Anniversary of the Chapel (Catho.be, 24.10.2011)

External links
Official website of the Chapel of the Resurrection (English, French)

Roman Catholic chapels in Belgium
Roman Catholic churches in Brussels
City of Brussels
European quarter of Brussels
Christian ecumenism